Annavasal is a panchayat town in Pudukkottai district  in the state of Tamil Nadu, India. Which is a part of Tiruchirapalli District before 14 January 1974 and merged with Pudukkottai district 14 January 1974. Annavasal is famous for jallikatu conduct at the month of February and weekly market

Geography
It has an average elevation of 128 metres (419 feet).

Demographics
 India census, Annavasal had a population of 7630. Males constitute 49% of the population and females 51%. Annavasal has an average literacy rate of 67%, higher than the national average of 59.5%; with 55% of the males and 45% of females literate. 12% of the population is under 6 years of age.

Schools 
Infant Jesus Matriculation School
Government Higher Secondary School
Government Primary School
Kokila Matriculation School
Government primary school-2 (segapattai)

Hospitals
Government Hospital
Best Life Care

References

Cities and towns in Pudukkottai district